Pulse Hobart is a Tasmanian digital publisher and broadcaster owned by Pulse Media Group Pty Ltd based in Hobart.

Pulse is best known for its local news and entertainment posts across social media platforms, such as Facebook and Instagram.

In addition to social media platforms, Pulse Hobart also publishes local Hobart and Tasmania news on their website - pulsehobart.com.au

Pulse also operates Pulse FM Hobart, a local Rhythmic CHR youth radio station available on iHeartRadio and FM.

According to Mediaweek (Australian magazine), Pulse Hobart reaches more than 150,000 Tasmanians each week, and is Tasmania's most engaged with commercial publisher on social media.

History 
Pulse started as a narrowcast radio station in 2016 as Pulse FM Kingborough and Huon, before rebranding to Pulse FM Tasmania in August 2018 and Pulse FM Hobart in March 2019.

At the start of September 2020, Pulse FM announced it would be pivoting to position itself primarily as a content publisher rather than a radio station, with the radio station moving in-line with the digital content platforms.

Between October 11, 2021 and February 2022, Pulse FM rebranded as Pulse Hobart - positioning itself completely as a digital publisher. The radio station remains under the Pulse FM branding.

In the 12 months of 2021, Pulse Hobart accumulated more than 2.4 million social media interactions.

References

Companies based in Hobart
Mass media companies established in 2016
Mass media in Hobart
Mass media companies of Australia
Radio stations in Hobart